Camboriú Futebol Clube, commonly known as Camboriú, is a Brazilian football club based in Camboriú, Santa Catarina state. The club was formerly known as Sociedade Desportiva Camboriuense.

History
The club was founded on 11 April 2003, as Sociedade Desportiva Camboriuense. They won the Campeonato Catarinense Third Level in 2006. The club was renamed to Camboriú Futebol Clube on 24 April 2009.

Achievements
 Campeonato Catarinense Série C:
 Winners (1): 2006

 Campeonato Catarinense:
 Runner-up (1): 2022

Stadium
Camboriú Futebol Clube play their home games at Estádio Roberto Santos Garcia, nicknamed Robertão. The stadium has a maximum capacity of 3,000 people.

References

Association football clubs established in 2003
Football clubs in Santa Catarina (state)
2003 establishments in Brazil